Jules Siegel (October 21, 1935 – November 17, 2012) was a novelist, journalist, and graphic designer who is best known as one of the earliest writers to treat rock music as a serious art, although his writings about rock constituted only a small part of his total output.  His work appeared over the years in Playboy, Best American Short Stories, Library of America's Writing Los Angeles, and many other publications. He occasionally contributed book reviews to the San Francisco Chronicle, and he administered newsroom-l, an email discussion list for journalists.

His articles about Brian Wilson, Bob Dylan, Thomas Pynchon and other prominent Americans were primary (and often unique) sources of information based on his personal acquaintance and extensive direct interviews with the subjects. "Goodbye Surfing, Hello God!" has been anthologized several times and is used as a primary source in every book about Brian Wilson's struggle to complete Smile, his "teenage symphony to God."

Background
Siegel attended Cornell University with Pynchon during the 1953–54 term and graduated from Hunter College with a degree in English and philosophy in 1959. He was involved in politics, working for both the Nixon and Kennedy campaigns. He began working as a journalist in 1964. In 1966, he published a piece about Bob Dylan for The Saturday Evening Post. According to Siegel, the article helped establish his credentials on the Sunset Strip, "which is about the only place that sort of thing counted then. ... My taking rock music seriously was considered one of my little quirks." Dylan biographer Clinton Heylin wrote that Siegel caught an interest in the Beach Boys and their increasingly sophisticated music after Pynchon recommended their 1966 album Pet Sounds. Conversely, in a 1977 article, Siegel supported that Pynchon had suggested that he write about the Beach Boys, but added that he himself introduced Pet Sounds to Pynchon.

Association with Brian Wilson

From late 1966 to early 1967, Siegel had a close acquaintance with Brian Wilson of the Beach Boys. He was first introduced to Wilson by Beach Boys associate David Anderle, who had enjoyed Siegel's article about Dylan and suggested that Siegel write about Wilson. Siegel, who had recently migrated from New York to Los Angeles, was impressed with Wilson, and he documented his experiences for an article which he had presold for The Saturday Evening Post. He became part of a coterie that accompanied Wilson for much of the band's Smile era, a circle that Siegel later referred to as the "Beach Boys marijuana-consumption squad".

By early 1967, Wilson had run into issues completing Smile and grew suspicious of his surrounding associates, including Siegel. Siegel said that Wilson "had forgotten that I was a journalist, and the reason he got rid of me was because Anderle reminded him of that – because of a disagreement that David and I had about what I would and wouldn't write ... After that [my girlfriend], I and Pynchon went to Studio A and [Michael] Vosse was there, and he said, 'No, you're barred.'"

As Siegel claims in his piece, The Saturday Evening Post ultimately rejected his story due his overly enthusiastic depiction of Wilson's material. It was instead published in the first issue of the magazine Cheetah in October 1967. The article subsequently propelled the mythology of Smile and the Beach Boys. It is the origin of several of the project's legends, including Wilson's fear of the film Seconds, his cancelling of a $3,000 recording session due to "bad vibrations", and his irrational fear of an acquaintance whom Wilson believed practiced witchcraft (Siegel later revealed that it had been his girlfriend). Writing in his 33⅓ book about the album, Luis Sanchez commented: 

Among the other topics discussed in Siegel's article: Wilson's race against Bob Dylan and John Lennon for the title of "genius", the formation of Brother Records, the moment Wilson decided to place a sandbox under the grand piano in his home, Wilson's collaboration with Van Dyke Parks and the tensions that ensued, and Carl Wilson's arrest for draft evasion from the previous April.

In 1971, Carl told Rolling Stone that Siegel's writings "and a lot of that stuff that went around before really turned [Brian] off." Anderle later alleged that Siegel had inflated the myth through writing falsehoods so that he could appear more "important". Siegel rebuked Anderle's allegation: "If it weren't so stupid, it would be libelous. ... I admired Brian a lot and I also liked him. ... I wasn't aware of him as a myth. I just wrote down what I saw and heard. ... It was fun hanging out with Brian and getting stoned but it was hardly important in the sense that David means."

Later years
In 1977, Playboy published Siegel's article "Who Is Thomas Pynchon and Why Is He Taking Off with My Wife". The article is a memoir about his relationship with Pynchon and Pynchon's affair with Siegel's second wife. According to journalist Adam Ellsworth, "In certain circles, this article is far better known than 'Goodbye Surfing, Hello God!' It is certainly more personal ..."

Siegel lived and worked in Mexico, beginning in 1981 (moving to Cancún in 1983), where he was a witness of the Hurricane Gilbert landfall. He was also active in the field of book art. Three of his works are in the Artists Books Collection of the Museum of Modern Art. His books and calligraphic journals were exhibited at Franklin Furnace in 1978. 

On November 17, 2012, Siegel died of a heart attack at age 77.

Bibliography

References

External links
 Who is Jules Siegel? – curriculum and selected credits

American short story writers
American male journalists
American graphic designers
1935 births
2012 deaths
Cornell University alumni
American male short story writers